The lemming vole (Alticola lemminus) is a species of rodent in the family Cricetidae. It is found only in the Russian Federation.

References

Further reading

Alticola
Mammals of Russia
Mammals described in 1898
Taxonomy articles created by Polbot